Heet or HEET may refer to 
HEET, High Entrance/Exit Turnstile 
Iso-HEET, a brand of isopropanol antifreeze produced by Gold Eagle
Hīt, a city in Iraq